The Signal Mountain Trail is a  long roundtrip hiking trail in Grand Teton National Park in the U.S. state of Wyoming. The trail begins near Signal Mountain Lodge on Jackson Lake and provides hiking access to the summit of Signal Mountain. The trail passes through Lodgepole Pine forests most of the way and the view from the summit of Signal Mountain provide sweeping views of the entire Teton Range and much of Jackson Hole.

See also
 List of hiking trails in Grand Teton National Park

References

Hiking trails of Grand Teton National Park